Kandasamys: The Wedding is a 2019 South African Indian romantic comedy drama film written by Rory Booth and Jayan Moodley and directed by Jayan Moodley. The film is a sequel to the 2017 blockbuster box office hit film Keeping Up with the Kandasamys. The film had its theatrical release across 41 local theatres on 18 April 2019 and gained extremely positive reviews from the audience. The film became a success at the box office similar to its prequel and was rated as one of the best African films of 2019.

Cast 

 Jailoshini Naidoo as Jennifer Kandasamy
 Maeshni Naicker as Shanthi Naidoo
 Madhushan Singh as Prishen
 Mishqah Parthiephal as Jodi
 Yugan Naidoo as Preggie Naidoo
 Koobeshen Naidoo as Elvis Kandasamy
 Mariam Bassa as Kaunam 'Aaya' Kandasamy
Rushil Juglall as Arsevan
Tesarnia Oree as Poobasha

Synopsis 
The plot revolves around the forthcoming wedding of Jodi (Mishqah Parthiepal) and Prishen (Madushan Singh), but the mothers  of both bride Jodi and the bridegroom Prishen, Jennifer Kandasamy (Jailoshini Naidoo) and Shanthi Naidoo (Maeshni Naicker) attempt to push their own demands and agendas for the big Wedding Day.

Production 
Following the success of Keeping Up with the Kandasamys, in July 2018, director Jayan Moodley made an announcement regarding the making of a sequel to the film. The principal photography of the film began in September 2018 and the portions of the film were predominantly set in Kwa-Zulu Natal while few scenes were also shot in a market near Verulam. The official trailer of the film was unveiled in December 2018.

Sequel
A sequel, Trippin' with the Kandasamys, was released on 4 June 2021.

References

External links 
 

2019 films
South African romantic comedy-drama films
2019 romantic comedy-drama films
English-language South African films
Films shot in KwaZulu-Natal
Films set in South Africa
South African Indian films
South African sequel films
2019 comedy films
2019 drama films
2010s English-language films